Don't Know How to Party is the third full-length album by the American ska punk band The Mighty Mighty Bosstones, which was released in 1993. Don't Know How to Party was The Mighty Mighty Bosstones' major label debut on Mercury Records, their first venture away from their original label Taang! Records. The album reached #187 on the Billboard 200, and spawned several singles, including the Bosstones fan favorite—"Someday I Suppose" (#19 Billboard Modern Rock Tracks). Lead singer Dicky Barret would later state that, "When we made `Don't Know How to Party', no one knew where [we] [were] coming from". Bassist Joe Gittleman stated that the album was "slower than [our] other records."

Reception
Gregory Perez of the Tampa Bay Times, said that the album "packs quite a wallop. While it isn't all ska, as Barrett is quick to point out, it is all Bosstones. Songs such as A Man Without and Issachar maintain the harder-than-calculus anthems that make live Bosstones shows such a brutal pleasure." AllMusic writer Steve Huey gave the album 2 and 1/2 stars, explaining that "the lackluster songwriting renders this album necessary for diehards only."

Track listing
All tracks were written by Dicky Barrett and Joe Gittleman.

"Our Only Weapon" – 3:07
"Last Dead Mouse" – 3:37
"Don't Know How to Party" – 3:14
"Someday I Suppose" – 3:28
"A Man Without" – 2:47
"Holy Smoke" – 2:52
"Illegal Left" – 3:11
"Tin Soldiers" – 3:24 (Originally by Stiff Little Fingers)
"Almost Anything Goes" – 4:11
"Issachar" – 3:46
"What Was Was Over" – 2:59
"Seven Thirty Seven/Shoe Glue" – 4:32

Big Rig 12" Vinyl bonus tracks

"Someday I Suppose" – 3:26
"Think Again" – 1:56
"Lights Out" – 0:49
"Police Beat" – 2:09
"Simmer Down"  – 3:34
"Drugs and Kittens"/"I'll Drink to That" (Live) – 6:17
"Howwhywuz Howwhyam" (Live) – 2:26
Previously available on Ska-Core, the Devil, and More EP.

Personnel
 Dicky Barrett  – lead vocals
 Nate Albert  – guitar, backing vocals
 Joe Gittleman  – bass, backing vocals
 Joe Sirois  – drums
 Tim "Johnny Vegas" Burton  – saxophone, backing vocals
 Kevin Lenear – saxophone
 Dennis Brockenborough  – trombone
 Ben Carr – Bosstone, backing vocals
Tony Platt  – producer, engineer
Brian Dwyer – trumpet
Molly Ackerman – vocals
Matt Rice – vocals
Darryl Jenifer  – vocals
Mike Teelucksingh – talking
Geoff Hunt – mixing
Eric Gast  – mixing assistant
Ben Argueta – art direction
Larry Stessel – design
Arthur Cohen – photography

Charts

Album

Singles

References 

1993 albums
The Mighty Mighty Bosstones albums
Mercury Records albums
Heavy metal albums by American artists